Carcassonne Agglo is the communauté d'agglomération, an intercommunal structure, centred on the city of Carcassonne. It is located in the Aude department, in the Occitanie region, southern France. It was created in January 2013. Its seat is in Carcassonne. Its area is 1062.2 km2. Its population was 112,852 in 2017, of which 46,031 in Carcassonne proper.

Composition
The communauté d'agglomération consists of the following 83 communes:

Aigues-Vives
Alairac
Alzonne
Aragon
Arquettes-en-Val
Arzens
Azille
Badens
Bagnoles
Barbaira
Berriac
Blomac
Bouilhonnac
Cabrespine
Capendu
Carcassonne
Castans
Caunes-Minervois
Caunettes-en-Val
Caux-et-Sauzens
Cavanac
Cazilhac
Citou
Comigne
Conques-sur-Orbiel
Couffoulens
Douzens
Fajac-en-Val
Floure
Fontiès-d'Aude
Labastide-en-Val
Laure-Minervois
Lavalette
Lespinassière
Leuc
Limousis
Malves-en-Minervois
Marseillette
Mas-des-Cours
Mayronnes
Montclar
Montirat
Montolieu
Monze
Moussoulens
Palaja
Pennautier
Pépieux
Peyriac-Minervois
Pezens
Pomas
Preixan
Puichéric
Raissac-sur-Lampy
La Redorte
Rieux-en-Val
Rieux-Minervois
Rouffiac-d'Aude
Roullens
Rustiques
Sainte-Eulalie
Saint-Frichoux
Saint-Martin-le-Vieil
Sallèles-Cabardès
Serviès-en-Val
Taurize
Trassanel
Trausse
Trèbes
Val-de-Dagne
Ventenac-Cabardès
Verzeille
Villalier
Villar-en-Val
Villarzel-Cabardès
Villedubert
Villefloure
Villegailhenc
Villegly
Villemoustaussou
Villeneuve-Minervois
Villesèquelande
Villetritouls

References

Agglomeration communities in France
Intercommunalities of Aude